The Youchang Forest Park is an urban park in Nanzih District, Kaohsiung, Taiwan.

History
The park used to be a graveyard. On 30 December 1982, it was turned into the Youchang Forest Park.

Architecture
The park covers an area of around 5 hectares. It has multi-functional grasslands, water areas and an amphitheater.

Transportation
The park is accessible within walking distance west from Nanzih Export Processing Zone Station of Kaohsiung MRT.

See also
 List of parks in Taiwan

References

1982 establishments in Taiwan
Parks established in 1982
Parks in Kaohsiung
Forest parks in Taiwan